Judith Scott is an American actress known for her roles in L.A. Doctors, Jake 2.0, and Dexter.

Early life 
She was born at Fort Bragg, North Carolina on Dec 22, 1965.

Career 
She portrayed Dr. Rose Kent on Season 1 of 24. She played a recurring role as Dr. Jenna Williams on the series CSI: Crime Scene Investigation. She portrayed Esmee Pascal on the Showtime series Dexter. She has guest-starred on Numbers, Family Law, Judging Amy, The X-Files, Frasier, Crossing Jordan, House, Forever Knight and many other series. 
She has also appeared in feature films such as Guess Who, Fracture, and Flightplan.

Her upcoming projects include Geechee and From Scratch.

Filmography

Film

Television

References

External links
 

African-American actresses
American television actresses
Actresses from North Carolina
People from Fort Bragg, North Carolina
Living people
Year of birth missing (living people)
21st-century African-American people
21st-century African-American women